An Choyoung (born September 25, 1979) is a professional Go player.

Biography 
An became a professional in 1993 at the age of 14. He was promoted to 8 dan in 2004, then 9 dan in 2005. He participated in the first China-Korea Kangwon-Land Cup where he won 2 games.

Titles & runners-up

References

1979 births
Living people
South Korean Go players